Sakon Nakhon City municipality Stadium is a multi-purpose stadium in Sakon Nakhon Province, Thailand. It is currently used mostly for football matches and is the home stadium of Sakon Nakhon F.C.

Multi-purpose stadiums in Thailand
Buildings and structures in Sakon Nakhon province
Sport in Sakon Nakhon province